Nathan Metsack (born January 10, 2001) is an American amateur soccer player who plays as a defender for USL League One club New England Revolution II via the New England Revolution academy.

Career

Youth
Metsack joined the New England Revolution academy from Oakwood Soccer Club in 2018. In 2020, Metsack spent time with the club's USL League One affiliate team New England Revolution II. He made his debut on August 29, 2020, appearing as a 72nd-minute substitute during a 4–0 loss against Chattanooga Red wolves.

References

2001 births
American soccer players
Association football defenders
Living people
Soccer players from Connecticut
New England Revolution II players
USL League One players
People from Ashford, Connecticut
Sportspeople from Windham County, Connecticut